Patrizio Hofer (born 2 April 1980) is a compound archer from Switzerland.

He regularly represents Switzerland at the highest level World Archery Federation competitions, including the FITA Archery World Cup and the World Archery Championships. In 2008 and 2009 he reached the World Cup final, finishing 2nd and 3rd respectively. His highest world ranking is 4, achieved in 2010.

References

1980 births
Living people
Swiss male archers